is a train station on the Keihan Electric Railway Keihan Main Line located in Asahi-ku, Osaka, Osaka Prefecture, Japan.

Opened in 1910, the station is famous for its long covered shopping street known as the Sembayashi Shōtengai. The shopping street even has a theme song that can be heard as you walk along the covered part of the street. Sembayashi-Ōmiya Station can be found at the other end of the shopping street.

The first Daiei store opened near this station. Some of the favorite stores have been the Kadoya Ice Cream Parlor, a popular hangout for students of the nearby high school.

Layout
The station has 2 side platforms serving a track each on the 2nd level, outside of the inner tracks.

Adjacent stations

References

Asahi-ku, Osaka
Railway stations in Osaka
Railway stations in Japan opened in 1910